The 2004 European Judo Championships were the 15th edition of the European Judo Championships, and were held in Bucharest, Romania from 14 May to 16 May 2004.

Medal overview

Men

Women

Medals table

Results overview

Men

60 kg

66 kg

73 kg

81 kg

90 kg

100 kg

+100 kg

Women

48 kg

52 kg

57 kg

63 kg

70 kg

78 kg

+78 kg

References
 Results of the 2004 European Judo Championships (International Judo Federation)
 About the 2004 European Judo Championships (International Judo Federation)

External links
 

 
E
Judo Championships
European Judo Championships
International sports competitions hosted by Romania
Sports competitions in Bucharest
2000s in Bucharest
Judo competitions in Romania
May 2004 sports events in Europe